Neuroscience is a peer-reviewed scientific journal of neuroscience. It was established in 1976 with P.G. Kostyuk, Rodolfo Llinás, and A.D. Smith as founding editors-in-chief and originally published by Pergamon Press. The current editor-in-chief is Juan Lerma Gómez (Spanish National Research Council). The journal is published by Elsevier on behalf of the International Brain Research Organization (IBRO).

The journal continues the IBRO News section formerly published in Brain Research.

Abstracting and indexing
The journal is abstracted and indexed in:

According to the Journal Citation Reports, Neuroscience has a 2020 impact factor of 3.590.

Notable articles
, the following articles are the most downloaded according to the publisher's data:

References

External links

Neuroscience journals
Elsevier academic journals
Publications established in 1976
English-language journals